Michael Zev Gordon (born 1963, London) is a British composer of Jewish descent.

A past oboe player, Gordon studied composition at King's College, Cambridge with Robin Holloway, and subsequently with Oliver Knussen and John Woolrich, and in Italy with Franco Donatoni.  He was a composition pupil of Louis Andriessen from 1989 to 1990. His work has often involved a deep engagement with the subject of memory, with the use of quotation of, or allusion to, other music, sometimes explicit, sometimes more buried. He has himself also spoken of his work in terms of 'turbulence seeking serenity'. Stylistically, this could be seen in the relationship between tonal and more dissonant materials in his music.

Key works include the oboe concerto The Fabric of Dreams (2006), premiered by Nicholas Daniel and the Britten Sinfonia, The Impermanence of Things for piano, ensemble and electronics (2009), a London Sinfonietta commission, Allele for 40 voices (2010), a project involving the science of genetics, Bohortha  for large orchestra (2012), a BBC Symphony Orchestra commission, Seize the Day (2016), a Birmingham Contemporary Music Group Sound Investment commission, his Violin Concerto (2017), a BBC Symphony Orchestra commission, and Raising Icarus (2022), a chamber opera for six singers and eight instrumentalists, premiered at the Birmingham Rep.

Gordon was the recipient of the Prix Italia 2004 for his composition for radio A Pebble in the Pond, and two British Composer Awards, for Allele and for This Night for choir and solo cello (2009), a commission for the choir of King's College, Cambridge. He has taught at the universities of Durham, Southampton and at the Royal College of Music. Since 2012 he has been Professor of Composition at the University of Birmingham. His music is published by Wise Music and Composer's Edition.

Worklist

References

External links
 Official Website
 Publisher's Website
 SoundCloud page with recordings of Gordon's compositions
 NMC Recordings biography of Gordon
BCMG commission

British classical composers
British male classical composers
Living people
1963 births
British Jews
20th-century classical composers
21st-century classical composers
Jewish composers
Musicians from London
Academics of the University of Southampton
Pupils of Louis Andriessen
Academics of the University of Birmingham
20th-century British composers
21st-century British composers
20th-century British male musicians
21st-century British male musicians
British oboists